Mykyta Senyk is a Paralympic athlete from Ukraine competing mainly in category T38 sprint events.

He competed in the 2008 Summer Paralympics in Beijing, China.  There he won a bronze medal in the men's 100 metres - T38 event and a bronze medal in the men's 200 metres - T38 event

External links
 

Paralympic athletes of Ukraine
Athletes (track and field) at the 2008 Summer Paralympics
Athletes (track and field) at the 2012 Summer Paralympics
Paralympic bronze medalists for Ukraine
Living people
Year of birth missing (living people)
Medalists at the 2008 Summer Paralympics
Medalists at the World Para Athletics Championships
Medalists at the World Para Athletics European Championships
Paralympic medalists in athletics (track and field)
Athletes (track and field) at the 2020 Summer Paralympics